Diskin is a family name. Notable people with the surname include: 
 Yehoshua Leib Diskin (Maharil Diskin), a leading rabbi, Talmudist, Biblical commentator, founder of Diskin Orphanage
 Avraham Diskin, an Israeli political scientist
 Benjamin Diskin, an American voice actor
 Matt Diskin, British head coach, rugby
 Yuval Diskin, 12th Director of the Israeli Internal Security Service Shabak